The Virginia Slims of Hollywood is a defunct WTA Tour affiliated women's tennis tournament played from 1977 to 1979. It was held in Hollywood, Florida in the United States and played on indoor carpet courts.

Past finals

Singles

Doubles

External links
 1977 ITF tournament edition details
 1978 ITF tournament edition details
 1979 ITF tournament edition details

Indoor tennis tournaments
Carpet court tennis tournaments
Hollywood, Florida
Defunct tennis tournaments in the United States
Virginia Slims tennis tournaments
Tennis tournaments in Florida
1977 establishments in Florida
1979 disestablishments in Florida
Recurring sporting events established in 1977
Recurring sporting events disestablished in 1979
Women's sports in Florida